Worzel Gummidge is a 2019 British TV fantasy drama series and an adaptation of the Worzel Gummidge books by Barbara Euphan Todd. It stars Mackenzie Crook, who also wrote and directed the series, as the scarecrow. It was produced by Leopard Pictures and was broadcast by BBC One on 26 and 27 December 2019.

A third episode was announced as in production by the BBC on 8 September 2020, and was broadcast on Christmas Eve 2020.

A fourth episode had been set to broadcast in 2020 but production was halted due to the COVID-19 pandemic. This episode was broadcast on 6 November 2021 with two further episodes broadcast on the BBC in late December 2021.

Cast
Mackenzie Crook as Worzel Gummidge
India Brown as Susan
Thierry Wickens as John
Zoë Wanamaker as Lady Bloomsbury Barton
Rosie Cavaliero as Mrs Reenie Braithwaite
Steve Pemberton as  Mr Henry Braithwaite
Vicki Pepperdine as Aunt Sally
Michael Palin as The Green Man
Francesca Mills as Earthy Mangold
Shirley Henderson as Saucy Nancy
Brian Blessed as Abraham Longshanks
Vanessa Redgrave as Peg
Spencer Jones as Reggie
Paul Kaye as Guy Forks
Toby Jones as Mayor Mr Whittington, Baker Mr Whitebread, Alderman Mr Wheelturn, Postmaster Mr Whistler, Butcher Mr Winkelman & Publican Mr Wheatsheaf.
Aaron Neil as Lee Dangerman
Bill Bailey as Mr Peregrine
Nneka Okoye as Calliope Jane
Tim Plester as Clarty and Fisherman Sam

Production
The programme was written and directed by Mackenzie Crook and was produced by Leopard Pictures, Treasure Trove Productions and Lola Entertainment. Kristian Smith was the executive producer for Leopard Pictures with Lisa Thomas and Mackenzie Crook executive producers for Lola Entertainment and Treasure Trove Productions respectively. Patrick D. Pidgeon and Eric S. Rollman were executive producers for Pidgeon Entertainment, Inc. the rights holders to Worzel Gummidge.
The music was written by Adrian McNally and performed by Northumberland band The Unthanks, the group having provided two songs for Crook's previous sitcom Detectorists.

Filming locations in Hertfordshire and Bedfordshire include: Valence End Farm near Dunstable, Bedfordshire used for Scatterbrook Farm scenes; countryside near Berry Bushes Farm in Kings Langley, Hertfordshire for the Ten Acre Field scenes; and Highfield Park in St Albans, Hertfordshire for Earthy’s allotment scenes.

Episodes

Series overview

Series 1 (2019)

Special (2020)

Series 2 (2021)

References

External links

Production company page (Leopard Pictures)

2019 British television series debuts
2010s British children's television series
2020s British children's television series
BBC children's television shows
British children's comedy television series
British children's fantasy television series
British television shows based on children's books
English-language television shows